Roman Hagara (born 30 April 1966) is an Austrian sailor who has won the gold medal in the Tornado class at two consecutive Olympic Games.

Hagara, and his colleague Hans-Peter Steinacher won the gold medal in the Tornado class at the 2000 Summer Olympics in Sydney, and successfully defended their title at the 2004 Summer Olympics in Athens, which, to date, makes them Austria's the most successful summer sport athletes as the first professional Austrian sailing team.

Hagara was the Flagbearer for the Austrian team at the 2004 Summer Olympics Opening Ceremony. Along with his teammate Steinacher, he has won the Austrian Sports Personality of the Year twice, in 2000 and 2004.

America's Cup & Red Bull Youth America's Cup 

Since 2009 he has focused more on the big boat scene with Hans-Peter Steinacher, including competing on an America's Cup yacht. Hagara was the skipper of Hagara-Steinacher Racing (HS Racing) in the 2011–13 America's Cup World Series.

Under the flag of the United States for San Francisco's Golden Gate Yacht Club, the duo competed in a 2013 America's Cup World Series event in Naples, Italy. Racing this event gave the team firsthand experience in what has become Hagara and Steinacher's primary focus, mentoring the next generation of sailors on the next generation of sail boats: hydrofoils.

Extreme Sailing Series 

Roman Hagara is currently also the skipper for Red Bull Extreme Sailing Team in the Extreme Sailing Series. With the series' announcement that foiling catamarans will be part of its future, Hagara and Steinacher have taken on a full crew of athletes who honed their skills in the Red Bull Youth America's Cup.

Mentoring Young Talents 

As of 2015, Roman Hagara and Hans-Peter Steinacher mentor young sailors in three series: as sports directors of Red Bull Foiling Generation and the Red Bull Youth America's Cup, and as leaders of the Red Bull Extreme Sailing Team that competes in the Extreme Sailing Series. Hagara and Steinacher look for the best and most talented sailors in their respective age groups to give them insights and show them a new way of sailing.

Background 

Originally trained in windsurfing, Roman Hagara soon competed against his now teammate Hans-Peter Steinacher, until they decided in 1997 to train for the 2000 Olympics together. Before 1997, Roman Hagara worked as crew, then changed to skipper. His brother also sailed, Andreas Hagara.

In the 2000 Olympics, the team was the very first to work with customized sails. Since then, the team has always focused on being ahead of technological developments, which now shows in their involvement in the foiling technology.

References

External links
 
 
 
 Homepage of Roman Hagara and Hans-Peter Steinacher
 Red Bull Extreme Sailing Team

1966 births
Living people
Austrian male sailors (sport)
Olympic gold medalists for Austria
Olympic sailors of Austria
Sailors at the 1992 Summer Olympics – Tornado
Sailors at the 2000 Summer Olympics – Tornado
Sailors at the 2004 Summer Olympics – Tornado
Sailors at the 2008 Summer Olympics – Tornado
Olympic medalists in sailing
Medalists at the 2004 Summer Olympics
Extreme Sailing Series sailors
Medalists at the 2000 Summer Olympics
Oracle Racing sailors
Tornado class world champions
World champions in sailing for Austria